Ayad Akhtar (born October 28, 1970) is an American playwright, novelist, and screenwriter of Pakistani heritage, awarded the 2013 Pulitzer Prize for Drama. His work has received two Tony Award nominations for Best Play, an Award in Literature from the American Academy of Arts and Letters and the Edith Wharton Citation for Merit in Fiction. Akhtar's writing covers various themes including the American-Muslim experience, religion and economics, immigration, and identity. In 2015, The Economist wrote that Akhtar's tales of assimilation "are as essential today as the work of Saul Bellow, James Farrell, and Vladimir Nabokov were in the 20th century in capturing the drama of the immigrant experience."

Background and career
Akhtar was born in Staten Island, New York City, and raised in Milwaukee, Wisconsin. His interest in literature was initially sparked in high school. Akhtar attended Brown University, where he majored in theater and religion and began acting and directing student plays. After graduation he moved to Italy to work with Jerzy Grotowski, eventually becoming his assistant. Upon returning to the United States, Akhtar taught acting alongside Andre Gregory and earned his Master of Fine Arts degree in film directing from Columbia University School of the Arts.

In 2012, Akhtar published his first novel American Dervish, a coming-of-age story about a Pakistani-American boy growing up in Milwaukee. The book was met with critical acclaim, described by The New York Times as "self-assured and effortlessly told." American Dervish has been published in over 20 languages and was a Kirkus Reviews best book of the year.  Akhtar's narration of the audio book was nominated for an Audie Award in 2013.

Akhtar's first produced play, Disgraced premiered in 2012 at the American Theater Company in Chicago before being staged at Lincoln Center Theater in New York. The play went on to win the Obie Award and the 2013 Pulitzer Prize for Drama and premiered at the Bush Theatre in London that spring. The play opened on Broadway at the Lyceum Theatre on October 23, 2014, and was nominated for the Tony Award for Best Play.

Akhtar's second play The Who & The What premiered at La Jolla Playhouse in February 2014, followed by a run at Lincoln Center Theater in June. The Who & The What has gone on to be produced around the world with notable productions in Berlin, Hamburg, and the Burgtheater in Vienna, Austria. The latter production has run for almost two years and won Austrian film star Peter Simonischek the Nestroy Award for Best Actor.

His third play The Invisible Hand premiered at the New York Theatre Workshop in December, 2014, a production which invited comparison to the work of Shaw, Brecht, and Arthur Miller. It would go on to win the Obie Award, the John Gassner Award, be nominated for multiple Lucille Lortel Awards and the New York Drama Critics Circle Award. In May 2016, the play premiered in London at The Tricycle Theatre and received nominations for the Evening Standard and Laurence Olivier awards.

In 2016, American Theatre magazine declared Akhtar the most produced playwright in the country.

Akhtar's latest play Junk: The Golden Age of Debt premiered on Broadway at the Vivian Beaumont Theater, produced by Lincoln Center Theater, on November 2, 2017. It was nominated for the Tony Award for Best Play and was awarded the Edward M. Kennedy Prize for Drama. In his final interview Bill Moyers referred to Junk as "not only history but prophecy. A Biblical-like account of who's running America, and how." Moyers added: "Our times at last have found their voice, and it belongs to a Pakistani American: Ayad Akhtar."

In 2017, Akhtar won the Steinberg Playwright Award. In his acceptance speech at Lincoln Center Theater, later published in The New York Times, he explained why he believes the theater is only more important now than it ever has been:A living being before a living audience. Relationship unmediated by the contemporary disembodying screen. Not the appearance of a person, but the reality of one. Not a simulacrum of relationship, but a form of actual relationship.

The theater is an art form scaled to the human, and stubbornly so, relying on the absolute necessity of physical audience, a large part of why theater is so difficult to monetize. It only happens when and where it happens. Once it starts, you can't stop it. It doesn't exist to be paused or pulled out at the consumer's whim. It can't be copied and sold. In a world increasingly lost to virtuality and unreality — the theater points to an antidote.

A living actor before a living audience. The situation of all theater, a situation that can awaken in us a recollection of something more primordial, religious ritual — the site of our earliest collective negotiations with our tremendous vulnerability to existence. The act of gathering to witness the myths of our alleged origins enacted — this is the root of the theater's timeless magic.

Akhtar's second novel, Homeland Elegies, was published in September, 2020 by Little, Brown and Company. According to the publisher's press release, the book is drawn from Akhtar's life as the son of Muslim immigrants, blending fact and fiction to tell a story of belonging and dispossession about the world that 9/11 made. The New York Times named Homeland Elegies one of the 10 Best Books of 2020, calling the book "pitch perfect... virtuosic." The Washington Post, Time, Entertainment Weekly, and Publishers Weekly also named it one of the 10 best books of 2020, with the Post stating that it would not be "surprised if it wins [Akhtar] a second Pulitzer Prize." Slate, O, NPR, The Economist, and Kirkus Reviews named Homeland Elegies one of the best books of 2020. Barack Obama named it one of his favorite books of 2020. Homeland Elegies was shortlisted for the Andrew Carnegie Medals for Excellence in Fiction, and won the 2021 American Book Award. An eight-episode limited series of Homeland Elegies is in development at FX, starring Kumail Nanjiani and adapted by Akhtar and Oren Moverman, who will direct all the episodes.

On December 2, 2020, Akhtar became president of PEN America. In 2021, Akhtar was named New York State Author by the New York State Writers Institute.

In 2023, it was announced that he would co-pen with Matthew Decker the libretto for the stage musical adaptation of Damien Chazelle's 2016 film La La Land, which will be directed by Bartlett Sher, with Justin Hurwitz and Pasek & Paul returning as songwriters.

List of works

Theater 
 TBA La La Land
 2016 Junk: The Golden Age of Debt. Little, Brown and Company
 2015 The Invisible Hand. Little, Brown and Company
 2014 The Who & The What. Little, Brown and Company
 2013 Disgraced. Little, Brown and Company

Books 
 2020 Homeland Elegies. Little, Brown and Company 
2012 American Dervish. Little, Brown and Company

Film and television

Awards 

2021 Edith Wharton Citation of Merit for Fiction
2019 Erwin Piscator Award
2017 Steinberg Playwright Award
2017 Award in Literature from the American Academy of Arts and Letters

Homeland Elegies 

The New York Times 10 Best Books of 2020
The Washington Post 10 Best Books of 2020
Time 10 Best Books - Fiction
Publishers Weekly 10 Best Books of 2020
An O Book of the Year
A Kirkus Reviews Book of the Year
A Slate Best Book of 2020
A New York Public Library Best Book of the Year
NPR: A Best Book of 2020
Barack Obama: A Favorite Book of 2020
2021 Shortlisted for Andrew Carnegie Medals for Excellence in Fiction
2021 Wisconsin Library Association Literary Award
2021 American Book Award

Junk 
 2018 Nominated for Tony Award for Best Play
 2018 Nominated for Outer Critics Circle Award
 2017 Edward M. Kennedy Prize for Drama

The Invisible Hand 

 2022 Nominated for Olivier Award
 2017 Nominated for Olivier Award

2016 Nominated for Evening Standard Award
2015 Nominated for New York Drama Critics Circle Award
2015 Obie Award for Playwriting
 2015 Outer Critics Circle John Gassner Award
 2015 Nominated for Lucille Lortel Award for Outstanding Play

Disgraced 
2017 Nestroy Award for Best Play – Authors Prize
2015 Nominated for Tony Award for Best Play
2013 Pulitzer Prize for Drama
2013 OBIE Award
2013 Nominated for Outer Critics Circle John Gassner Award
2013 Nominated for Off Broadway Alliance Awards Best New Play

American Dervish 
 Named a Kirkus Reviews Best Book of the Year
 Named a Globe and Mail Best Book of the Year in Toronto    
 Named a Shelf Awareness Best Book of the Year
 Named an O, The Oprah Magazine Book of the Year

The War Within 
2006 Nominated for the Independent Spirit Award for Best Screenplay

References

Further reading 
 
———————
Notes

External links

 

 
1970 births
21st-century American dramatists and playwrights
21st-century American male actors
21st-century American male writers
21st-century American novelists
21st-century American screenwriters
21st-century Muslims
American expatriates in Italy
American male dramatists and playwrights
American male film actors
American male novelists
American Muslims
American writers of Pakistani descent
Brown University alumni
Columbia University School of the Arts alumni
Living people
Male actors from Milwaukee
Male actors from New York City
Muslim writers
Novelists from New York (state)
Novelists from Wisconsin 
Pakistani dramatists and playwrights
Pulitzer Prize for Drama winners
Screenwriters from New York (state)
Screenwriters from Wisconsin
Writers from Milwaukee
Writers from Staten Island